WBYN-FM (107.5 FM) is a Christian radio station that currently plays Contemporary Praise and Worship Christian music along with Christian feature programs and church services. The station is licensed to Boyertown, Pennsylvania and serves the Reading area. The station is under ownership of WDAC radio company. WBYN has two transmitters. The main transmitter is in a rural area 6 miles away from the station. The auxiliary transmitter and tower is located behind the station at 280 Mill street.

History
The station was founded by Dave Hendricks and was first assigned the call sign WBYO in 1969. The station employed a Christian teaching format with traditional Christian music played in between features. The station was a commercial operation but steered clear of Contemporary Christian Music except for a few hours on Saturday afternoon. On September 14, 1989, the station was sold and changed the call sign to WYCL and flipped to a gold based downtempo Adult Contemporary music format. The station played a couple new songs per hour but leaned light. The station played several uptempo songs an hour. Artists included The Beatles, Billy Joel, Kenny Rogers, Whitney Houston, Gloria Estefan, Chicago, Supremes, Elton John, The Stylistics, George Michael, and others. After a few years the station proved to be unsuccessful with the new format and went bankrupt. WYCL went bankrupt due to the failure of the owners listening to hired consultants from the west coast. Until then this station was #1, beating WRFY 102.5. The owners walked away from the station. Revenue dropped, due to advertisers finding out what was going on. This was all due to mismanagement.  On January 24, 1992, the station was sold to WDAC Radio Inc. It was assigned the call sign WBYN and returned to Christian radio format which consisted of preaching, teaching, traditional Christian music, and information features.  The station would sell time blocks to various ministries. On September 19, 2005, the call sign was slightly altered to WBYN-FM in preparation for a simulcast with 1160 AM (formerly WYNS), which adopted the WBYN call sign a week later.

The music was traditional Christian music and played a few hours in mornings, late afternoons, and weekends. Some time in the 1990s, the station began mixing in softer contemporary Christian artists as well as Contemporary Praise and Worship Music. By 2000, the station was playing mostly Praise and Worship music and adopted the phrase "Life Changing Radio".

WFKB Frank FM

WBYN and WBYN-FM were entered into an LMA with Nassau Broadcasting Partners early in 2006. WBYN 1160 kept the Christian format while WBYN-FM became "Frank FM" WFKB on March 15, 2006, broadcasting an Adult Rock/Classic rock hybrid formatted radio station. Frank FM had live air personalities during the day. Ken And Jenn in the morning, Randi Ellis middays (also PD/MD), Brian DiMario in afternoons, former Y100 Philadelphia jock John Von and Mike Roberts at night.  Frank FM was also the launching pad for a then weekend personality named Rob Soscia, who now goes by his real name Brian Soscia and hosts The Soscia Network Radio Show formerly of Philadelphia's Mix 106.1 and now 2-7pm Mon-Fri on 93.7 WSTW. Other on-air personalities included Jay Pinnel and Zack Morse. The station started off as a hybrid of Hot AC, Classic Hits and Pop Alternative playing over 2000 songs. By the end of 2006, the station evolved into more of a heavily rock leaning classic hits format, including songs up until 1995. Core artists included Billy Joel, Kansas, Phil Collins, The Beatles, Elton John, Led Zeppelin, Fleetwood Mac, Chicago, Boston, Eagles, James Taylor, The Who, Neil Young, Kenny Loggins, The Cars, and many others. WFKB also began broadcasting in HD Radio and began to multicast. WFKB analog and WFKB-HD1 broadcast "Frank FM" while WFKB-HD2 broadcast the Christian format that also airs on 1160 WBYN.

Return to WBYN-FM, coming Alive

On March 31, 2009, the LMA between Nassau and WDAC-FM (owners of the license of WFKB) expired after being extended several times since November 2008 and the station's call sign reverted to WBYN-FM. On March 31, 2009 the station dropped the Frank FM format and reverted to a similar religious format it had been broadcasting prior to the LMA but not identical programming to 1160 WBYN which was on WBYN-FM HD-2. Nassau did acquire WBYN 1160. That station, therefore, kept the religious format that previously aired on WBYN-FMHD2. WBYN-FM's religious format focuses slightly more on music and slightly less on teaching, though Nassau's 1160 WBYN religious format has a moderate amount of overlap with WBYN-FM's format. So WBYN and WBYN-FM are separately owned. WBYN-FM has opted not to broadcast on HD1 or HD2 for the time being. Though not consecutively, 107.5 has been a Christian-formatted station on the FM dial for over fifty years.

From the Newsletter: "The Nassau-WDAC deal struck in August 2005 was for an eventual purchase price of $22 million, and an LMA fee of $100,000 the first year, rising to $300,000 in the third year. Owner WDAC continued to operate its very successful Christian teaching WDAC (94.5) in the Lancaster, PA market."

As of early 2018, WBYN-FM's signature catchphrase was "Positively Different 107.5 Alive".

See also
Media in the Lehigh Valley

External links
 WBYN-FM's Official 107.5 Alive Website

 
 

Contemporary Christian radio stations in the United States
Radio stations established in 1969
1969 establishments in Pennsylvania
BYN-FM